The 1979 Atlanta Falcons season was the Falcons' 14th season. The Falcons were trying to improve upon their 9–7 record in 1978 and make it to the playoffs for the second time in team history, their first appearance being the year before. Rookie fullback William Andrews rushed for 167 yards in a 40–34 overtime win over the Saints in the season opener in New Orleans. Andrews set a team record with 1,023 yards, while quarterback Steve Bartkowski became the first Falcon to surpass the 2,000-yard mark with 2,505. However, the Falcons' defense allowed 388 points and the team finished 6–10.

Offseason

NFL Draft

Undrafted free agents

Personnel

Staff

Roster

Regular season

Schedule

Note: Intra-division opponents are in bold text.

Standings

References

External links
 1979 Atlanta Falcons at Pro-Football-Reference.com

Atlanta Falcons
Atlanta Falcons seasons
Atlanta Falcons